The Belarusian Women's Party "Nadzieja" (Belarusian for "Hope") is a political party in Belarus which opposes the administration of president Alexander Lukashenko.  In legislative elections held between October 13–17, 2004, the party did not secure any seats. It was created in 1994. Leader of the party is Alena Jaśkova.

On October 11, 2007, the Supreme Court of Belarus liquidated the Belarusian Women's Party "Nadzieja".

References

Banned political parties
Feminism in Belarus
Feminist parties in Europe
Political parties in Belarus